Douglas Steven "Doug" Heffernan is a fictional character and the protagonist in the American sitcom The King of Queens. The character has also appeared in Everybody Loves Raymond, Becker, and Cosby. The character is portrayed by Kevin James, whose stand-up comedy provided the comedic themes and general style of the show. Doug, a smart aleck, often immature "Average Joe", lives in Rego Park, Queens, with his wife Carrie Heffernan (Leah Remini), and his father-in-law Arthur Spooner (Jerry Stiller).

Doug is a delivery driver for the International Parcel Service (a fictional version of United Parcel Service), a job Doug acquired by pretending to work there after lying to then-girlfriend Carrie about having a job.

Background
Doug was born on February 9, 1965, in Montreal, Quebec, Canada, while his mother Janet (played by Jenny O'Hara) and father Joe (Dakin Matthews) were attending a friend's wedding there. His parents had told him that he had been born in New York City and only discovered the truth as an adult in the episode "Dog Shelter." He has one sister, a physical education teacher named Stephanie, played by Ricki Lake.

Doug's father owned a small hardware store in Queens, and his mother was a homemaker. References in several episodes indicate that the Heffernan home was a Catholic one, although Doug seems to have strayed from this after moving out. He lived with his parents until 27, before he moved into Richie's apartment. It also appears that Doug's father, Joe, wanted Doug to assume control over the hardware store when he came of age, but Doug showed little interest in this venture.

He was an overweight child and was even sent to "fat camp" by his parents. Doug's weight battle was frequently a subject of contention between himself and his wife, with Carrie encouraging him to eat healthier, but Doug was steadfast in his enjoyment of fried foods and snacks. Carrie's domineering personality over the more easygoing Doug was another frequent subject matter, with Doug secretly defying her demands (over clothing and type of cologne, for example).

Doug is an avid sports fan, supporting the New York Mets, New York Jets, New York Knicks, and the New York Islanders. Doug would propose to Carrie at a Jets game. One year for Christmas, when he was given a Miami Dolphins Christmas ornament, Doug openly didn't like it because both the Jets and Dolphins played in the AFC East. (Despite the Jets–Patriots rivalry becoming more intense during the show's run than the Dolphins–Jets rivalry, it was never mentioned on the show; however, the Monday Night Miracle did take place during the show's third season.) Doug's love for the Mets is reflective of James in real life; he named his daughter Shea Joelle after the then-home of the Mets, Shea Stadium.

Doug attended St. Gregory's High School in Queens, where he befriended Spence Olchin; he also went to school with his cousin Danny. Doug played high school football as a St. Gregory's Commodore and was a star player and starting fullback. He was All-County in football during his junior and senior years. Frequent references to this era show that Doug was very popular in school, and because of this, he thinks of high school as the best years of his life. Unlike other popular jocks who usually bully outsiders and geeks, Doug never liked that in high school, which is why he was favored. In the episode "Hi, School," Doug says to Carrie during an argument: "Oh I see what's going on; you're mad because I rocked in high school, and you didn't." Carrie was the mean girl and rebellious teenager in high school, and Doug was the slacker and sometimes an outsider who wanted to be liked in high school. After graduation, he went on to junior college (Nassau Community College, located on Long Island) but dropped out after eight days without any clear plan. He tried out for the Nassau County Rebels, a semi-professional football team, but ultimately quit because of politics.

He later acquired a job as a bouncer at a bar. Around this time, his friend Richie Ianucchi, a firefighter for the FDNY, introduced him to his future wife, Carrie Spooner. While dating Carrie, Doug inadvertently landed his final and longest-standing job as a truck driver for the fictional International Parcel Service (IPS).

Doug's trademark phrase is "Shutty!" as a means of telling people to "shut up."

Marriage
Early in the series, it was stated that Doug and Carrie had known each other in junior high. That story was re-written; the new plot said that Doug and his friend Richie met Carrie at a club, then went on a double date that did not go well until the end. Doug first met Carrie's father, Arthur (Jerry Stiller), at a Thanksgiving dinner that went wrong. Doug was nearly scared away by Arthur, who disapproved of the relationship, but later in this episode, he and Carrie declare their love for one another.

Doug and Carrie got engaged at a Jets game and married in 1995, before the start of the series. Initially, they lived with Arthur while searching for a house. After finding a house, Arthur's wife died, his home burnt down, and he was forced to move in with them.

In Season 6, the loving couple decides to renew their vows to show their love and affection for one another. The idea came to be during a romantic dinner where Doug becomes inspired and courageously proclaims his love to his wife, Carrie. Carrie is touched by her husband's kindness and suggests to Doug that they should renew their vows. As the days roll on, the couple's initial enthusiasm for renewing their vows quickly dwindles. They soon find that planning the wedding is becoming a hassle and much more troublesome than they had initially expected. Through mutual agreement, they call off the wedding, and the couple calls their friends and relatives to let them know of the cancellation; however, to their surprise, the reaction of the relatives and friends is unexpected. Doug's mother worries about something wrong with her son's marriage. Doug and Carrie's frustrations grow as rumors of their marriage complications are spread. They decide that the ceremony will go ahead, and despite further difficulties (finding a chimp to serve as Doug's best man proves tough), Doug and Carrie renew their wedding vows.

At the end of the series, Doug and Carrie adopt a baby girl from China. On the same day, Carrie realizes that she is pregnant.

Friends
Doug's best friend is fellow IPS driver, Deacon Palmer (Victor Williams), who is married to Carrie's best friend, Kelly (Merrin Dungey). His other friends include lifelong friend, subway booth worker Spence Olchin (Patton Oswalt), a firefighter named Richie Ianucchi (Larry Romano), cousin Danny (Gary Valentine); dog walker Holly (Nicole Sullivan); and next-door neighbor, bodybuilder Lou Ferrigno (played by himself). Another friend of Doug's, Ray Barone (Ray Romano) also appears as a guest on several episodes of the show; likewise, he has also appeared on several episodes of Romano's show, Everybody Loves Raymond, as well as other New York-based CBS shows such as Cosby and Becker.

After King of Queens
In 2016, Doug resurfaced on several television spots for a new CBS sitcom starring Kevin James, called Kevin Can Wait. In these ads, he meets up with the man who played him, and they have a short banter about the upcoming sitcom. In one ad, he suggests portraying a next-door neighbour to James' new character. In another, while watching television and bringing up the fact that King of Queens is currently in reruns, he tempts James (who is about to eat a plate of carrot sticks) with a large bucket of fried chicken, which the actor eats.

References

Fictional truck drivers
Fictional characters from Montreal
Television characters introduced in 1998
Male characters in television
The King of Queens characters